Miroslav Krišan is a politician in Serbia. He was the mayor of Kovačica from 2000 to 2015 and has served in the National Assembly of Serbia and the Assembly of Vojvodina. Krišan is a member of the Democratic Party (Demokratska stranka, DS).

Private career
Krišan is an electrical technician from the village of Debeljača in Kovačica. In 1992, he became the manager of a shoe factory in the municipality.

Politician

National Assembly
Krišan appeared in the twenty-seventh position (out of twenty-eight) on the Democratic Party's electoral list for the Zrenjanin division in the 1993 Serbian parliamentary election. The list won four mandates, and, perhaps improbably, he was included in the party's delegation when the assembly convened in January 1994. (From 1992 to 2000, Serbia's electoral law stipulated that one-third of parliamentary mandates would be assigned to candidates on successful lists in numerical order, while the remaining two-thirds would be distributed amongst other candidates at the discretion of sponsoring parties or coalitions. Krišan's low position on the list did not prevent him from receiving a mandate.) At the time he was sworn in, Krišan was the youngest member of the assembly. The Socialist Party of Serbia (Socijalistička partija Srbije, SPS) won the election, and the DS served in opposition.

The DS boycotted the 1997 parliamentary election, and Krišan was not a candidate for re-election.

Mayor of Kovačica
In 2000, the Democratic Party joined the Democratic Opposition of Serbia (Demokratska opozicija Srbije, DOS), a broad and ideologically diverse coalition of parties opposed to Slobodan Milošević's administration. DOS candidate Vojislav Koštunica defeated Milošević in the 2000 Yugoslavian presidential election, a watershed moment in Serbian and Yugoslavian politics. The DOS won a landslide majority in Kovačica in the concurrent 2000 Serbian local elections, and Krišan was chosen afterward as mayor. He oversaw the privatization of several local industries in his first term, and in 2002 he presided over the municipality's two-hundredth anniversary.

Serbia introduced the direct election of mayors in the 2004 local elections, and Kriśan was re-elected in Kovačica. This system was discarded after a single term; Krišan led the Democratic Party to victories in the 2008 and 2012 local elections and was confirmed for new terms as mayor both times. He was arrested in October 2013 on suspicion of corruption involving overpayments for local road construction. He denied the charge, saying that it was politically motivated. He was acquitted in 2018, by which time he had already left the mayor's office.

Krišan was replaced as mayor in October 2015, when the Serbian Progressive Party (Srpska napredna stranka, SNS) formed a new coalition in the municipality. He again led the DS list in the 2016 local elections and was re-elected when the list won nine mandates. The SNS won a majority victory, and he served in opposition. The DS boycotted the 2020 local elections, and he was not a candidate in that cycle.

Provincial and republican politics after 2000
Serbia's electoral system was reformed in 2000, such that all mandates were awarded to candidates on successful lists at the discretion of the sponsoring parties or coalitions, irrespective of numerical order. Krišan appeared in the 179th position on the DS's electoral list in the 2003 parliamentary election and did not receive a mandate after the list won thirty-seven seats. He sought election to the DS's presidency in 2006 but was not successful.

Krišan appeared in the thirty-eighth position on the DS's For a European Vojvodina list in the 2008 Vojvodina provincial election and was given a mandate when the list won twenty-three proportional seats. The DS and its allies won a majority victory, and Krišan served as a supporter of the provincial administration; he also chaired the assembly committee for administration and local self-government. He resigned his provincial seat in May 2010 due to a change in Vojvodina's conflict-of-interest laws involving dual mandates.

Serbia's electoral laws were changed again in 2011, such that all mandates were awarded in numerical order to candidates on successful lists. Krišan appeared in the twenty-third position on the DS's list in the 2012 provincial election and was not re-elected when the list won sixteen proportional mandates. He was promoted to the sixteenth position in the 2016 provincial election and missed election when the list fell to ten seats.

He also received the 121st position on the DS's list in the 2014 Serbian parliamentary election. Election from this position was improbable, and he was not elected when the list won nineteen mandates.

Electoral record

Local (Kovačica)

References

1968 births
Living people
People from Kovačica
Members of the National Assembly (Serbia)
Mayors of places in Serbia
Members of the Assembly of Vojvodina
Democratic Party (Serbia) politicians